Mr. Butterfly (Nabi) is a 2003 South Korean action film. The film is the writing and directorial debut (and, as of 2011, only) film of Kim Hyeon-seong, sometimes credited outside Korea as Marc Kim.

As the distinction between singular and plural is not as important in Korean, the original title could be translated as "butterfly or "butterflies".

External links
 Review at Variety
 
 

2003 films
South Korean action drama films
2000s Korean-language films
2003 directorial debut films
2000s South Korean films